The Yaka languages are a clade of Bantu languages coded Zone H.30 in Guthrie's classification. According to Nurse & Philippson (2003), with a couple additions the languages form a valid node. They are:
 Yaka, Suku–Sonde, Mbangala, Shinji (Yungo), (H40) Hungana, (B80) Yansi (a variety or varieties)
The Yaka languages appear to be closest to Kongo.

Footnotes

References